Oriental MS 425, is a bilinguical Bohairic-Arabic, uncial manuscript of the New Testament, on paper, now in the British Library in London.  It is dated by a colophon to the year 1308. The manuscript is lacunose.

Description 
It contains the text of the four Gospels on 164 paper leaves (25.4 by 18.5 cm) with a large lacunae (Luke, John 1:1-19:6; 20:13-21:13). The text is written in two columns per page, 33 lines per page. 

It lacks text of Matthew 18:11.

History 

The manuscript was written by Joannes, a scribe.

The manuscript was purchased by Archdeacon Henry Tattam's sale. The manuscript was examined by Lightfoot and Arthur Headlam.

Horner saw the manuscript in 1892. He used it in his edition of the Bohairic New Testament as a basis for the text of the Gospels.

See also 

 List of the Coptic New Testament manuscripts
 Coptic versions of the Bible
 Biblical manuscript
 Codex Marshall Or. 99
 Oriental MS 426

References

Further reading 
 George Horner, The Coptic Version of the New Testament in the Northern Dialect, otherwise called Memphitic and Bohairic, 1 vol. (1898), pp. XCVIII-CI

Coptic New Testament manuscripts
14th-century biblical manuscripts
British Library oriental manuscripts